Shanked! is the third studio album by San Pedro-based punk band Toys That Kill, released on May 30, 2006 by Recess Records.

Track listing

"Katzenscheibe Uber Alles" 
"Bomb Sniffin' Dogs" 
"Bill Buckner" 
"Run Away..." 
"Safe & Warm" 
"Mr. Hubbard's Dead" 
"They Caught Us All" 
"They Tied Up All Our Lace" 	
"Katzenscheibe Uber Alles" 
"Widows On Welfare" 
"Liar's Hook" 
"I Hate Karma" 
"Peeping On Peeping Tom" 
"The Worm's Inside" 
"Sound Check World" 
"Activate" 
"31 Year Old Daydream"

Personnel
Todd Congelliere – Vocals, Guitar
Sean Cole – Vocals, Guitar
Jimmy Felix – Drums
Chachi Ferrera – Bass, Vocals

Reception
Punk News gave the album four stars and called it "an incredibly enjoyable, incredibly simple, incredibly incredible punk album."

References

2006 albums